The Jesus and Mary Chain are a Scottish alternative rock band formed in East Kilbride in 1983. The band revolves around the songwriting partnership of brothers Jim and William Reid. After signing to independent label Creation Records, they released their first single "Upside Down" in 1984. Their debut album Psychocandy was released to critical acclaim in 1985 on major label WEA. The band went on to release five more studio albums before disbanding in 1999. They reunited in 2007 and released the album Damage and Joy in 2017.

Biography

Early years
Brothers Jim and William Reid had been inspired to form a band as far back as 1977, having heard groups of the British punk scene; in the early 1980s they formed their own. William stated, "It was perfect timing because there weren't any guitar bands. Everybody was making this electronic pop music." Before forming the band, the brothers had spent five years on the dole, during which they wrote and recorded songs at home and worked out the sound and image of the band. Originally called The Poppy Seeds, and then Death of Joey, they initially told journalists that they had taken their eventual name from a line in a Bing Crosby film, although six months later they admitted that this was not true. Other accounts suggest that the name derived from an offer on a breakfast cereal packet, where customers could send off for a gold Jesus & Mary chain.  As neither brother wanted to be the singer, they decided Jim would be via him losing a coin toss.

The brothers started recording and sending demos to record companies in 1983 (using a Portastudio bought with £300 given to them by their father from redundancy pay after he lost his factory job), and by early 1984 they had recruited bass player Douglas Hart and teenage drummer Murray Dalglish. Early influences included The Velvet Underground, The Stooges, and The Shangri-Las, William stating in 1985, "We all love The Shangri-Las, and one day we're going to make Shangri-Las records." Jim mentioned his liking for Pink Floyd, Siouxsie and the Banshees, The Monkees and Muddy Waters. Early demos displayed a similarity to the Ramones, prompting the brothers to add another element to their sound; in William's words: "That's why we started using noise and feedback. We want to make records that sound different." They began playing live in Spring 1984. In the early days William Reid's guitar would be left out of tune, while Dalglish's drum kit was limited to two drums, and Hart's bass guitar only had three strings, down to two by 1985; in Hart's words, "That's the two I use. I mean what's the fucking point spending money on another two? Two is enough."

Struggling to get gigs, the band took to turning up at venues claiming to be the support band, playing their short set and making a quick exit. After failing to generate any interest from concert promoters and record labels in Scotland, the band relocated to Fulham, London, in May 1984, and soon afterwards their demo tape was passed to fellow Scot Alan McGee by Bobby Gillespie. Subsequently, McGee promoted a gig for the band at the Living Room in London in June 1984. On the strength of hearing the band sound check, McGee signed them to his Creation Records label on a one-off deal, and McGee also became the band's manager. Their debut single, "Upside Down", was recorded in October and released in November that year. The sessions were produced by Joe Foster, but McGee, unsatisfied with Foster's work, remixed the A-side, although the B-side, a cover version of Syd Barrett's "Vegetable Man", remained credited to Foster. The band were gaining increasing attention from the music press at this time with Neil Taylor of the NME describing them as "the best band in the world".

Dalglish left in November 1984 after a dispute over money and was replaced shortly afterwards by Bobby Gillespie who had also formed Primal Scream two years earlier in 1982. "Upside Down" topped the UK Indie Chart in February 1985 and then again in March and stayed on the chart for 76 weeks, selling around 35,000 copies in total, making it one of the biggest-selling indie singles of the 1980s.

Playing in front of small audiences, during early shows the Mary Chain performed very short gigs, typically fuelled by amphetamines and lasting around 20 minutes, and played with their backs to the audience, refusing to speak to them. In late December 1984, the band performed as part of the ICA Rock Week. During their performance, bottles were thrown on stage, with press reports exaggerating events and claiming that there had been a riot, and national newspaper The Sun running a story on the band concentrating on violence and drugs, the band attracting the tag "The new Sex Pistols". This led several local councils to ban the band from performing in their area.

Psychocandy

The success of "Upside Down" led to interest from WEA-subsidiary Blanco y Negro Records which signed the group in early 1985. The group released the single "Never Understand" in February which reached number forty-seven in the UK Singles Chart. The label had initially refused to press the single due to its B-side, "Suck", but went ahead given the alternative put forward by the band, a song called "Jesus Fuck". The band were eager to get "Jesus Fuck" released, and McGee got as far as producing test pressings of a re-issue of "Upside Down" with the song on the B-side, before the band insisted that Blanco y Negro include the track on their next single. The follow-up, "You Trip Me Up", was delayed due to staff at the pressing plant refusing to press it due to the presence of the song, now re-titled "Jesus Suck"; The single was released in June 1985 with a new B-side, "Just Out of Reach". John Peel got the band to record a second session for his BBC Radio 1 show in February 1985 (the first was only a few months earlier), and the band also made a TV appearance on Whistle Test in March and The Tube the same year. The third single for Blanco y Negro, "Just Like Honey", released in October, gave them their biggest hit to date, reaching No. 45.

Eager to avoid the violence of earlier gigs and to give an opportunity for their songs to be heard without distortion and feedback, the band planned to perform several unannounced acoustic sets supporting Sonic Youth, but this was abandoned when the plans were leaked. Their debut album Psychocandy followed in November that year. The album fused together the Reids' two primary influences: the guitar noise of the Stooges and the Velvet Underground with the pop songwriting and melodies of the Beach Boys, The Shangri-Las and Phil Spector; In fact, the album's opening song, "Just Like Honey," borrows Hal Blaine's famous drum intro from The Ronettes 1963 classic, "Be My Baby", produced and co-written by Spector. The record received unanimously positive reviews and is now considered a landmark recording. Drummer Gillespie announced his departure from the band in October 1985, to concentrate on Primal Scream. He had recorded most of the drums on Psychocandy, with John Moore filling in when Gillespie was unavailable, eventually joining the band to replace him. John Loder also acted as a stand-in drummer when Gillespie was unavailable for live performances.

When the band signed to Blanco y Negro in January 1985, there were stories reporting that they had stolen money from managing Director Rob Dickens's jacket and destroyed his office, all untrue but seen as good publicity by manager McGee. In a performance on Belgian television in March 1985, the band did smash the set and the audio equipment, but this was at the request of the TV producer. Such behaviour became expected of the band and many shows culminated with the Reids trashing their equipment, which was often followed by the audience throwing projectiles onto the stage and damaging equipment.

On 15 March 1985, the Jesus and Mary Chain played a gig at the North London Polytechnic in front of one of their largest crowds up to that point. The organizers had overbooked the venue, leaving hundreds of fans locked outside. When Gillespie and Hart attempted to break the locks, the police were called. Support band Meat Whiplash had stirred up violence before the Mary Chain set foot onto the stage when singer Paul McDermott threw an empty wine bottle into the audience, prompting four members of the crowd to attack him, leading to their set being abandoned. Second act The Jasmine Minks got through their set without incident, but The Jesus and Mary Chain then kept the audience waiting for over an hour before taking the stage, and then left the stage after playing for less than twenty minutes. Members of the audience began throwing cans at where the band were hiding behind the stage curtains, before mounting the stage to smash the equipment that remained there. The violence continued for some time before police eventually took control. The venue blamed the band's late appearance and two equipment breakdowns, while McGee issued a statement saying that "the audience were not smashing up the hall, they were smashing up pop music", going on to say "This is truly art as terrorism". The violence soon started to become a hindrance to the band, with people attending concerts simply for the violence rather than the music, William commenting "I hate it, I despise it. It gets in the way in terms of getting more gigs, and it gets in the way of our image". Many performances were cancelled during the remainder of 1985, with promoters or local councils not prepared to risk a riot. The violence flared up again at a performance at the Electric Ballroom in Camden Town in September, with bottles thrown at the band while they played, and a section of the audience smashing up the amplification equipment and smashing the lights afterwards, with several people injured by flying glass. A major factor in the audience reaction was the length of the band's sets at the time, which lasted less than twenty-five minutes, Jim explaining this with "there's never been a group good enough to play any longer". Lack of songs was also a factor, according to Jim: "We've only got enough songs to play for that long".

After the success of the album in the UK, the band embarked on a tour of the United States in late 1985 and 1986, followed by a tour of Japan. On returning to the UK they toured the UK, this time without the trouble that had marred earlier performances. The band revived their acoustic intentions with a stripped-down session for John Peel in November 1985, which included "Psychocandy", the original album title track that was omitted from the release, and "Some Candy Talking", a song which they had been performing for over a year, but had been left off the album. A second version of "Some Candy Talking" was issued on a free EP issued with the NME in January 1986, and the song was released as the band's next single in July. It reached number thirteen in the UK Singles Chart, but attracted controversy when BBC Radio 1 DJ Mike Smith decided that the song was a paean to illegal drugs (denied by the band at the time, but admitted by William a year later) and convinced the station to ban it from being played.

Darklands and Automatic
In September 1986, the band parted ways with manager Alan McGee, and came close to splitting up later in the year, with Jim Reid suffering from "exhaustion". John Moore had become an established member, but moved to rhythm guitar, with former Redskins member Martin Hewes joining the band briefly (although he strongly denies ever joining) and former Dead Can Dance percussionist James Pinker taking over on drums. Blanco y Negro manager Geoff Travis took over management duties, and the band returned in December with two gigs at the National Ballroom in Kilburn, London, where they premiered new songs including "April Skies" and "Hit". Early in 1987, they entered the studio to record their second album. The first fruits of these sessions were released on the "April Skies" single in April, which saw the band have their first top ten hit. The Beach Boys influence was evident on the B-side, which included "Kill Surf City", a reworking of Brian Wilson's "Surf City". The various formats released also included a cover of Bo Diddley's "Who Do You Love?", a tribute to him with "Bo Diddley is Jesus", and a live version of Can's "Mushroom". "Happy When It Rains" was the second pre-album single, strongly influenced by Smokey Robinson's "My Girl", but it failed to match the success of "April Skies", only reaching number twenty-five. The band set out on another UK tour, this time with sets stretching to 45 minutes, although to a mixed reaction from the music press. They toured without a drummer, instead using a drum machine.

The band's second album, Darklands, was released during the tour, in September, described by writer Steve Taylor as "the definitive blend of light and shade". Featuring a more melodic sound, the album was recorded almost entirely by the Reids themselves, replacing live drums with a drum machine, and received overwhelmingly positive reviews by the British music press. The album's title track was released as a single in October, and the band were thrown off the ITV music show The Roxy when they failed to mime well enough to it.

The band's dangerous reputation culminated at a gig at the RPM club in Toronto in November 1987, when after being heckled throughout the gig by a group in the audience, Jim Reid thrust his microphone stand towards them, hitting one on the head. Jim was arrested and spent a night in jail, before being bailed to return the following February. He was subsequently given an absolute discharge after agreeing to give around £500 to a Salvation Army charity and apologise to the complainant.

With the court case hanging over the band, they compiled a collection of B-sides and rarities for release in April 1988 as Barbed Wire Kisses. They also selected live tracks from a Detroit concert the previous November for release while they planned further studio work. Dave Evans, former Mary Chain soundman and bass player with Biff Bang Pow! (which also featured Alan McGee and Dick Green of Creation Records) was recruited in September 1987 to replace Moore, who formed John Moore and the Expressway. Richard Thomas joined on drums in early 1988. The band had been using drum tapes on tour before Thomas. Their next release was the new recording "Sidewalking", released in March 1988, and backed by some of the live tracks, followed a month later by Barbed Wire Kisses. Later that year, they did a remix for the single "Birthday" by The Sugarcubes.

In September 1989, The band provided backing vocals for the Erasure single "Drama!".

The band's third studio album Automatic was released in October 1989, by which time Evans had been replaced by Ben Lurie. Boasting heavy use of synthesized bass and keyboards, the album was not received quite as well as its predecessors. It contained the singles "Head On" and "Blues from a Gun". By this time, the violence that was originally associated with the band was practically non-existent and the Reid brothers were less antagonistic and aggressive in general. The Rollercoaster EP (August 1990) would be their last release for over a year, the band undertaking a tour of the same name with My Bloody Valentine, Dinosaur Jr. and Blur.

The 1990s
Douglas Hart had moonlighted with the Acid Angels in 1988, and left the band in 1991, to have a career in film making, before picking up his bass again in 2006, playing with the Sian Alice Group, Le Volume Courbe and Cristine. Thomas also quit the band to join Renegade Soundwave. The fluid nature of the Mary Chain's line up continued throughout their entire career, with a revolving door of drummers, bassists and guitarists being recruited for TV appearances and gigs whenever they were required, the only constants being the Reid brothers. The Reid brothers recruited former Starlings rhythm section Matthew Parkin and Barry Blackler to replace Hart and Thomas.

The brothers bought their own recording studio in 1991 in Elephant & Castle in South London, which they dubbed The Drugstore, and they returned in February 1992 with the first fruits of the new studio, their next single, "Reverence", which gave them their biggest hit single in almost five years, reaching No. 10 in the UK. Spitting feedback and punk rock bile in every direction, the track was banned from being played on BBC Radio 1 and from Top of the Pops, due to its potentially offensive lyrics ('I wanna die just like JFK, I wanna die in the USA'...'I wanna die just like Jesus Christ, I wanna die on a bed of spikes'). The single was followed by the release of the album Honey's Dead (1992), which received mixed reviews. Following the Rollercoaster Tour to support the album, the band concentrated on cracking the United States, with an appearance on David Letterman's show, and a tour as part of the Lollapalooza line-up, which William later described as "the worst experience of our lives," followed by their own headlining tour. In December 1992, the Reids again lost their rhythm section, with Ben Lurie returning and Steve Monti joining on drums. Another compilation was released in 1993, The Sound of Speed, before they returned to the studio to record their fifth album proper, Stoned & Dethroned which would see release in 1994, and featured guest appearances from Shane MacGowan and William's then-girlfriend Hope Sandoval. The album was originally planned as an acoustic album, but this idea was abandoned because, in Jim's words, "We couldn't do enough interesting things with acoustic guitars to make an album". In the 1995 EP released under American Records, a number of new works and B-sides were published which were later collected in the album Munki.

Following the release of the 1995 compilation Hate Rock 'N' Roll, the Mary Chain parted ways with Blanco y Negro, their record label of over a decade, and re-signed to their original label Creation Records, and Sub Pop in America. The band now included former Lush bassist Phil King. They then recorded 1998's Munki album, which would turn out to be their last before splitting the following year. Munki was commercially the least successful album the band released, peaking at number forty-seven in the UK Album Chart. The album featured the Reid's sister Linda, who sang on the track "Mo Tucker" as well as vocals from Hope Sandoval on "Perfume".

Though it was not until October 1999 that the split was made official, on 12 September 1998, William had a falling out in the tour bus with guitarist Ben Lurie before they were to play a sold out performance at the famous Los Angeles House of Blues. Jim appeared onstage apparently drunk and barely able to stand or sing. William walked offstage about 15 minutes into their set, and the show ended. The audience was later refunded the price of their tickets. The band finished up their U.S. and Japanese dates without William, but from that point, it was clear that the band was at its end. Jim Reid said in 2006 of the tension between himself and William: "After each tour we wanted to kill each other, and after the final tour we tried".

Post-split

Immediately after the split, William Reid went solo as Lazycame—having already released a solo EP in April 1998—and Jim Reid founded Freeheat along with Lurie and ex-Gun Club bassist Romi Mori and Earl Brutus drummer Nick Sanderson, although neither act received much attention or found any success. In October 2005, it was announced that the Reids were reunited; Jim Reid's track "Song for a Secret" a duet with his wife Julie Barber, was released as a single, paired up with Sister Vanilla's "Can't Stop The Rock", which was written and produced by William Reid and the brothers' younger sibling, Linda. The single was released by Transistor Records on 17 October. Jim Reid promoted his side of the single with a very rare solo gig at London's Sonic Cathedral club on John Peel Day, Thursday 13 October 2005. He finished this appearance with a performance of the early Mary Chain classic "Never Understand". Jim Reid also performed new material at low-key gigs with a new band comprising Phil King on guitar, Loz Colbert (Ride) on drums and bassist Mark Crozer (International Jetsetters).

In 2006 five albums were reissued through Rhino Records: Psychocandy, Darklands, Automatic, Honey's Dead and Stoned & Dethroned on 11 July 2006. Each album was released with a DVD containing three promo videos from that particular album.

Reunion: 2007–present
They performed at Coachella 2007 in April. During their 27 April 2007 main-stage performance, they were joined onstage for the song "Just Like Honey" by actress Scarlett Johansson (who acted in the film Lost in Translation, which featured the song). At the warm up gig on 26 April 2007, in Pomona, California, they were instead joined by Annie Hardy of Giant Drag. The band's first UK performance since reforming was at the Meltdown festival in June.

In an interview to Uncut magazine, Jim Reid announced that a new album by the band was in the works. In March 2008, the band released a studio recording of "All Things Must Pass" on the soundtrack album to the NBC television drama Heroes. It was their first new song released since 1998. In September, Rhino Records released a 4-CD box set entitled The Power of Negative Thinking: B-Sides & Rarities. The box set consists of material from the Barbed Wire Kisses, The Sound of Speed and The Jesus And Mary Chain Hate Rock 'n' Roll compilations, alongside unreleased tracks and rarities from throughout their career; including early performances, unheard demos, re-mixes, alternate versions of some songs and bootleg recordings.

In 2010, a greatest hits album, Upside Down: The Best of The Jesus and Mary Chain, was released via Music Club Deluxe. In 2012, between March and September, the band went back on tour with a series of dates through North America, which also included their very first gigs in China in May.  It was confirmed through the band's official website that John Moore would be returning on guitar, while Fountains of Wayne drummer Brian Young confirmed via Twitter that he would be replacing Loz Colbert.  The Jesus and Mary Chain also performed two gigs in Tel Aviv on 19 and 20 October at which shows John Moore was replaced by Mark Crozer. In an interview posted to Whopper Jaw in September, Jim Reid revealed that he and his brother William had written songs for a new album, however, they had yet to enter the recording studio.

In 2013, it was announced that a full-discography vinyl box set, dubbed as The Complete Vinyl Collection, would be released for the band's 30th anniversary, via Demon Music Group. In March 2014 the band signed back to Alan McGee and became the first artists to sign to the newly reformed Creation Management. They announced November 2014 dates in the UK to debut the performance of Psychocandy Live, which toured through 2015 to celebrate the 30th anniversary of the album's release.

In September 2015, Jim Reid announced that the band were recording their first studio album since 1998. The album titled Damage and Joy was produced by Youth and released on 24 March 2017.

On 24 August 2017 Bobby Gillespie joined the band on drums for three songs during their performance at Vilar de Mouros Festival in Portugal.

In early 2018 the band changed management from Alan McGee's Creation Management to Principia Management led by David McBride, former partner in Scotland's oldest concert promoter Regular Music. 

In autumn 2018 they toured the US as special guests of industrial rock band Nine Inch Nails. Isobel Campbell joined the band on stage at the final four shows of the tour at the Hollywood Palladium in Los Angeles for the duets Sometimes Always (performed by Hope Sandoval on the original recording) and Black and Blues (performed by Sky Ferreira on the original recording on the 2017 album Damage and Joy). 

The band headlined the 10th anniversary of the Burger Boogaloo concert in Mosswood Park in Oakland, California, US on 6 and 7 July 2019, which was hosted again by John Waters.

In June 2021, the band sued Warner Music Group for control of their debut album Psychocandy, and later albums, and seeking $2.55 million in damages. Under Section 203 of the United States' Copyright Act of 1976, artists may reclaim the rights to their recordings after 35 years, provided that they serve timely and proper notice upon the current record label.

Discography

Psychocandy (1985)
Darklands (1987)
Automatic (1989)
Honey's Dead (1992)
Stoned & Dethroned (1994)
Munki (1998)
Damage and Joy (2017)

Members
 Jim Reid – vocals, guitar (1983–1999, 2007–present)
 William Reid – guitar, vocals (1983–1999, 2007–present)
 Mark Crozer – guitar (2007–2008, 2012), bass (2013–present)
 Scott Von Ryper – guitar (2015–present)
 Justin Welch – drums (2021–present)

Former members
 Douglas Hart – bass (1984–1991)
 Murray Dalglish – drums (1984)
 Bobby Gillespie – drums (1984–1986, 2017)
 Martin Hewes – drums (1986)
 James Pinker – drums (1986)
 Dave Evans – rhythm guitar (1987–1989)
 Richard Thomas – drums (1988–1990)
 Ben Lurie – rhythm guitar/bass (1989–1998)
 Steve Monti – drums (1990–1995)
 Matthew Parkin – bass (1992)
 Barry Blackler – drums (1992)
 Nick Sanderson – drums (1993–1998; died 2008)
 Lincoln Fong – bass (1994–1995)
 Geoff Donkin – drums (1998)
 Phil King – bass/guitar (1998, 2007–2015)
 Loz Colbert – drums (2007–2008)
 John Moore – guitar (1986–1987, 2012), drums (1985–1986)
 Duncan Cameron – guitar (1983–1984)
 Brian Young – drums (2012–2021)

Timeline

Cultural references
They were referenced in season 24, episode 22 of The Simpsons, "Dangers on a Train". The men of Springfield are helping Homer restore a train for Homer and Marge's anniversary. Reverend Lovejoy is reading a book called The Jesus and Mary Train. The song "Ebin" by Sublime references the Jesus and Mary Chain in the lyrics "Ebin was a cooly that I used to know / Now he's down with the PLO / He's cold kickin' it live with the KKK / No JMC, no JFA".

Their song "Just Like Honey" from Psychocandy was featured in the closing scene of the Sofia Coppola film Lost in Translation. In the 2000 movie High Fidelity, the album Psychocandy is recommended to a record store customer, with The Jesus and Mary Chain cited as picking up where Echo and the Bunnymen left off. The acoustic version of their song "Taste of Cindy" was featured in the 2009 Greg Mottola film Adventureland. The song "Reverence" from their Honey's Dead album was featured in the 1992 film Pet Sematary II. "Snakedriver" was featured on The Crow: Original Motion Picture Soundtrack. “Why’d You Want Me” was featured in the 1992 Pauly Shore film Encino Man.

A poster for the band is seen in the 1995 Bottom episode "Terror" in the scene where Richie (Rik Mayall) and Eddie (Ade Edmondson) fight three boys dressed as devils.

They were referenced by their acronym J.A.M.C. by the band Death Cab for Cutie in the song "We Looked Like Giants" from their fourth studio album Transatlanticism. Jimmy Eat World also referred to the band and their third album ("The DJ never has it, J.A.M.C. Automatic") in the lyrics of "The Authority Song" from their fourth album Bleed American. In addition, Jesus and Mary Chain are referenced in the song "Mildenhall" from The Shins's fifth full-length studio album, Heartworms. James Mercer mentions them as a band he frequently listened to as child in his time abroad in Suffolk, England.

The song "April Skies" was featured in the AMC TV series The Walking Dead in a scene from the episode entitled "Stradivarius". "Jesus", a character on the show, is seen listening to the song on a record player.
Pixies have covered Head On, famously including the cover on their Trompe Le Monde album.

In the episode of "Rachel, Jack and Ashley Too" from the TV series "Black Mirror", there is a poster of "Damage and Joy" album coming from Jack's room.

A poster of the artwork of "I Hate Rock 'n' Roll" appears in the 2006 film Lake Mungo.

References

Sources

External links

 
 
 1985 audio interview on RPM Club
 Long article in The Guardian, 2014
 The Making of Psychocandy, 2015 interview with Jim Reid
 The Jesus and Mary Chain's Psychocandy, 2016 article on The Literary Hub

 
Blanco y Negro Records artists
British shoegaze musical groups
Creation Records artists
Musical groups disestablished in 1999
Musical groups established in 1983
Musical groups from Glasgow
Musical groups reestablished in 2007
Musical quintets
Noise pop musical groups
Scottish alternative rock groups
Scottish indie rock groups
Scottish post-punk music groups
Sibling musical groups
South Lanarkshire
Sub Pop artists